The armoured flathead (Hoplichthys haswelli), also known as the deepsea flathead, glassy flathead or spiny flathead, is a species of marine ray-finned fish of the family Hoplichthyidae, the ghost flatheads. This species is found in the southwest Pacific Ocean.

Taxonomy
The armoured flathead was first formally described in 1907 By the Australian ichthyologist Allan Riverstone McCulloch with the type locality given as “35 miles east of Port Jackson, New South Wales, Australia, depth 800 fathoms”. The specific name honours Scots-born Australian zoologist William Aitcheson Haswell, who led the expedition on which the type specimen was obtained.

Description
The armoured flathead  has a highly flattened, broad head and an elongated depressed body. There is a row of spiny, bony plates called scutes running along the flanks from the head to the caudal peduncle. The side of the head is armed with four robust spines and thee have smaller spines between them. The first dorsal fin contains 5, rarely 6, spines, the second dorsal fin is separated from the first and contains 13 or 14 soft rays. The overall colour is pale reddish-pink on the upper head and body and whitish ventrally. The pelvic fins are white and the other fins are pinkish with the pectoral and second dorsal fins having dark spots. There caudal fin has a dark margin.

Distribution and habitat
The armoured flat head is found in the southwestern Pacific Ocean from Australia and New Zealand. In Australia it is found southern Queensland to Eucla, Western Australia on the Great Australian Bight. In New Zealand it is widespread but rare on the Campbell Plateau.

Biology
Armoured flatheads feed on fishes and decapod crustaceans.

Fisheries
Armoured flatheads are not targeted by commercial fisheries, despite being reputed to have highly palatable flesh, because the amount of edible muscle is too small even in the larger specimens.

References

 Tony Ayling & Geoffrey Cox, Collins Guide to the Sea Fishes of New Zealand,  (William Collins Publishers Ltd, Auckland, New Zealand 1982) 

Hoplichthyidae
Fish described in 1907
Taxa named by Allan Riverstone McCulloch